Winnie Markus (1921–2002) was a Czechoslovakia-born German film and television actress.

Selected filmography

 A Mother's Love (1939) - Rosl Pirlinger
  (1939) - Juana de Alvarado
 The Vulture Wally (1940) - Afra Kuttner
 Herz geht vor Anker (1940) - Lotte Kamphausen
 Im Schatten des Berges (1940) - Hedwig Brügger
 Die Kellnerin Anna (1941) - Marina
 Alarmstufe V (1941)
 Brüderlein fein (1942) - Toni Wagner - seine Tochter
 The Sold Grandfather (1942) - Ev Haslinger
 The Little Residence (1942) - Marianne Hartung
 Sommerliebe (1942) - Renate
 Whom the Gods Love (1942) - Konstanze Weber Mozart
 Fahrt ins Abenteuer (1943) - Gusti Lenz
 Tonelli (1943) - Nelly, 'Königin der Luft' Joros Partnerin
 Gefährlicher Frühling (1943) - Renate Willms
 Dir zuliebe (1944) - Maria Mansfeld - seine Frau
 The Enchanted Day (1944) - Christine Schweiger
 Das alte Lied (1945) - Stine
 In Those Days (1947) - Sybille / 1. Geschichte
 Between Yesterday and Tomorrow (1947) - Annette Rodenwald
 Morituri (1948) - Maria Bronek
 The Mozart Story (1948) - Constanza Weber Mozart
 Philine (1949) - Philine Dorn
 I'll Never Forget That Night (1949) - Eva Surén
 Liebesheirat (1949) - Isabell Prax
 The Prisoner (1949) - Cyprienne
 This Man Belongs to Me (1950) - Gretl Fänger
 Es begann um Mitternacht (1951)
 Begierde (1951) - Susanne Reval
 Das fremde Leben (1951) - Doris Hallgart
 A Thousand Red Roses Bloom (1952) - Ebba
 Come Back (1953) - Sabine Viborg
 They Call It Love (1953) - Maria West
 Kaiserwalzer (1953) - Luise Pichler - Lehrerin
 Love's Awakening (1953) - Sybill Berg, Pianistin
 The Big Star Parade (1954) - Himself
 Son of St. Moritz (1954) - Lore Engelhofer
 Kaisermanöver (1954) - Comtesse Valerie von Trattenbach
 Roman eines Frauenarztes (1954) - Beate
 Du mein stilles Tal (1955) - Elisabeth von Breithagen
 Devil in Silk (1956) - Sabine Uhl
 Crown Prince Rudolph's Last Love (1956) - Gräfin Larisch
 Liebe, die den Kopf verliert (1956) - Henriette Hergesheim
 Vergiß wenn Du kannst (1956) - Brigitte Sudeny
 Das Mädchen Marion (1956) - Vera von Hoff
 Nichts als Ärger mit der Liebe (1956)
 Made in Germany (1957) - Elise Abbe, geborene Snell
 Doctor Bertram (1957) - Martina Eichstätter
 Man ist nur zweimal jung (1958) - Marthe
 Hoch klingt der Radetzkymarsch (1958) - Lina Strobl, Sängerin am Theater an der Wien
 The Priest and the Girl (1958) - Herta
 What a Woman Dreams of in Springtime (1959) - Elisabeth Brandt
 Melodie und Rhythmus (1959) - Himself (uncredited)
 Ein Herz braucht Liebe (1960)
 Diana - Leidenschaft und Abenteuer (1973)

References

Bibliography
 O'Brien, Mary-Elizabeth. Nazi Cinema as Enchantment: The Politics of Entertainment in the Third Reich. Camden House, 2004

External links

Winnie Markus at Tuner Classic Movies

1921 births
2002 deaths
Czechoslovak emigrants to Germany
German film actresses
German television actresses
Actresses from Prague
20th-century German actresses
Recipients of the Cross of the Order of Merit of the Federal Republic of Germany